Bergmann is a Germanic-language surname.

Bergmann may also refer to:

A large number of pistols and machine guns designed by Theodor Bergmann and listed in his article
Bergmann Battalion
Bergmann Offensive of World War I
Bergmann gliosis, a pathological process in cerebellum
Bergmann Hotel, Alaska, USA

See also
Bergman (disambiguation)